Ocnerioxyna maripilosa is a species of tephritid or fruit flies in the genus Ocnerioxyna of the family Tephritidae.

Distribution
Uganda, Kenya.

References

Tephritinae
Insects described in 1947
Diptera of Africa